Saint-Jean-d'Aigues-Vives (Languedocien: Sant Joan d'Aigasvivas) is a commune in the Ariège department in southwestern France.

Population
Inhabitants are called Saint-Jeantéens.

See also
Communes of the Ariège department

References

Communes of Ariège (department)
Ariège communes articles needing translation from French Wikipedia